Synaphea lesueurensis is a shrub endemic to Western Australia.

It usually blooms between August and October producing yellow flowers.

It is found on hill slopes in a small area along the west coast in the Wheatbelt region of Western Australia between Coorow and Dandaragan where it grows in sandy soils over laterite or sandstone.

References

Eudicots of Western Australia
lesueurensis
Endemic flora of Western Australia
Plants described in 1995